Teschemacher is a surname, and may refer to:

 Edward Teschemacher (1876–1940), American lyricist and popular music composer
 Frank Teschemacher, an American jazz clarinetist and alto-saxophonist (1906-1932)
 Henry F. Teschemacher, tenth mayor of San Francisco (1823-1904)
 James Englebert Teschemacher, English scientist (1790-1853)
 Margarete Teschemacher, German operatic soprano (1903-1959)